The Mexican sex comedy film genre, generally known as Ficheras film or Sexicomedias was a genre of sexploitation and Mexploitation films of the Mexican cinema that flourished in the 1970s and 1980s. It is recognized as a collection of usually low quality films with low budgets. Although the films had sexual tones and used double entendre, they were not particularly explicit (it was common for the male characters in this films to comedically fail in their attempts to have sex the female characters, and when intercourse did happen the performances were exaggerated and pantomime-like, aiming to generate laughter more than arousal). The genre is possibly based on the Italian erotic comedies. The popular term for it came from the film Las ficheras, produced and released in 1975, which described the experiences of many women who entertained men at nightclubs.

The settings and plots of these films tended to be simple, usually dealing with the sexual escapades of working-class Mexicans; the male leads often being bricklayers, truck drivers and unemployed petty scammers, while the female leads often were nightclub dancers, waitresses or prostitutes in small brothels (althrought unfaithful wives and women with a busy sex life outside their job could occasionally be major characters). They frequently received classification as being unsuitable for minors.

Some of the films of this Mexican genre included El rey de las ficheras, La pulquería, Muñecas de medianoche, Bellas de noche, and Entre ficheras anda el diablo.

The best-known Mexican and international actors and actresses who were known to have participated in ficheras films were:
 Sasha Montenegro
 Angélica Chaín
 Andrés García
 Mauricio Garcés
 Lina Santos
 Lyn May
 Marcia Bell
 Leticia Perdigón
 Carmen Salinas
 Alfonso Zayas
 Jorge Rivero
 Alberto Rojas "El caballo"
 Rafael Inclán
 Roberto Ibañez
 Leopoldo García Peláez Benítez Polo Polo
 Antonio Raxel
 Raúl Padilla "El Choforo"
 Miguel M. Delgado
 Luis de Alba
 René Ruíz "Tun Tun"
 Pedro Weber "Chattanooga"
 César Bono
 Eduardo de la Peña "Lalo el Mimo"
 Rossy Mendoza
 Alfonso Zayas

See also 
 Commedia sexy all'italiana
 Sex comedy
 Cinema of Mexico
 Mexican LGBT+ cinema

References 

Sexploitation films
Comedy films by genre
Erotic films by genre
 

1970s in film
1980s in film